Necromantic may refer to:

 Necromancy, a form of magic involving communication with the deceased for the purpose of divination
 Nekromantik, a 1987 German horror film
 Nekromantik 2, a 1991 German horror film

See also
 Nekromantix, a Danish-American psychobilly band
 Necromancer (disambiguation)